Monarrhenus pinifolius is a species of plant in the sunflower family. It is endemic to Réunion.

References

Inuleae
Plants described in 1824
Flora of Réunion